Sala Biellese is a comune (municipality) in the Province of Biella in the Italian region Piedmont, located about  northeast of Turin and about  southwest of Biella.

Sala Biellese borders the following municipalities: Chiaverano, Donato, Mongrando, Torrazzo, Zubiena.

References

Cities and towns in Piedmont